Pimpri Chinchwad College of Engineering and Research (PCCOER) is a college in Pune, Maharashtra.

Introduction 
Under the auspices of Pimpri Chinchwad Education Trust, th e Pimpri Chinchwad College of Engineering & Research (PCCOER), Ravet, was founded in 2014. (PCET). Presently, the institute offers undergraduate programmes in four disciplines: civil engineering, computer engineering, electrical and computer engineering, and mechanical engineering. PCCOER is an ISO9001:2015-accredited institute affiliated with Savitribai Phule Pune University (SPPU), Pune, and approved by A.I.C.T.E., New Delhi, Govt. of Maharashtra, and D.T.E., Mumbai.

PCCOER has adopted Outcome-Based Education (OBE) and a student-centered approach since its inception. We adhere to a four-pillar philosophy, with Academic Excellence, research & innovation, professional competence, and social commitment constituting the four pillars of our Institute. The institute's experienced, devoted, and highly qualified (10 PhD holders and 40 PhD candidates) faculty, state-of-the-art infrastructure, and environment conducive to learning, research, and innovation have resulted in PCCOER's ranking as one of the top five institutions in the SPPU rankings. PCCOER has produced numerous University Rankers in a very brief period since its inception.  We place a great emphasis on research, innovation, product development, publication, filing for patents and intellectual property, incubation, and entrepreneurship.

PCCOER is one of the first organisations to adopt Project-Based Learning (PBL). Within its first five years, PCCOER has already reached several research milestones. The World Records of India has presented PCCOER with a Certificate of Recognition for filing the most copyright applications in a single day on February 16, 2018, and for 38 female colleges filing patents on December 17, 2019. Principal, faculty, and even non-teaching staff members have thought creatively and submitted patent applications. PCCOER considers research and intellectual property (IP) to be second nature.

In recent years, PCET and PCCOER have become synonyms for the best placements. For the placement of students, numerous activities such as aptitude training, group discussions, guidance from technical personnel and HR from reputable industries, communication and soft skills enhancement training, and mock interview sessions are conducted. The faculty and T&P cell's tremendous efforts have resulted in numerous quality placements and even a few international placements.

PCCOER conducts various activities for the overall development of its students. Several structured courses with added value are offered for the technical development of students. In Artificial Intelligence (AI), Internet of Things (IoT), Robotics, etc., Honor Courses with options for Major and minor have been introduced per SPPU guidelines. Students participate in a variety of co-curricular and extra-curricular activities, such as NSS camps, Unnat Bharat Abhiyaan, social and environmental cause events, International Yoga Day Celebration, Sports, Cultural Events, Induction Programmes, Farewell Programmes, Art workshops, Quizzes, Veteran's Visits, etc. The Institute and each department publish their own cultural and technical journals to which students enthusiastically contribute. Each department has its own Students' Association, which organizes numerous events each semester. Efforts are made to instil national pride and ethics. The academic programme begins each day with the National Anthem and a brief yoga session to improve concentration. We firmly believe that ancient traditions and contemporary technology are the two wheels on which an engineering aspirant's chariot leaps to success!

Courses Offered

Electronics and Telecommunication Engineering 
The Electronics and Communication Engineering degree programme at PCCOER emphasises the development of problem-solving skills for practical applications. Our student-centered learning environment includes opportunities for research experience, graduate degrees with Honors and minors, project-based learning, and internships. In addition, the department participates in a variety of technical and extracurricular activities that encourage students to broaden their conceptual horizons, innovate, and implement their ideas. In addition, it maintains excellent relations with industries.

The Electronics & Communication Engineering Department at PCCOER was established in 2014 and has made steady and consistent progress since then. The Department employs Outcome-Based Education (OBE), in which the entire programme and all instructional efforts are centred on the clearly defined outcomes that we expect students to demonstrate upon leaving the institution. In lieu of simply accumulating credits, we strive to deliver such content and implement such pedagogies and evaluations that our students achieve high order learning and mastery.

The department offers a 4-year, 8-semester full-time undergraduate degree programme in Electronics and Communication Engineering. The department has a sufficient number of qualified, experienced, and devoted faculty members and support personnel. The department has spacious classrooms and nine experimentation laboratories, as well as a Separate Project laboratory and a research and innovation laboratory with the most advanced field-relevant equipment. BaThe sic Electronics Laboratory, Electronics Hardware Laboratory, Communication Laboratory, Digital Electronics Laboratory, Digital Signal Processing Laboratory, Embedded System Laboratory, Programming Laboratory-I, Programming Laboratory-II, and Mechatronics & Power Electronics Laboratory are the laboratories available.

The department equips students with a solid foundation of fundamental, scientific, and technical knowledge, a multidisciplinary approach, and critical thinking skills to serve as the basis for lifelong learning in an E&TC Engineering career. The department teaches students how to plan, analyse, design, develop, organise, and manage E&TC Engineering projects. In addition, the department instils professionalism, ethics, the right attitude, effective communication skills, teamwork, and the ability to identify social needs and provide engineering solutions in its students.

Civil Engineering 
As such, civil engineering plays a crucial role in the development of any nation, as it encompasses infrastructure development. Through competitive exams such as UPSC, MPSC, and IES,civil engineers can seek employment in the public sector. Civil engineers may register as consultants or independent contractors with various pub-ic sector organisations. Civil engineers can find excellent employment opportunities in multinational and national private corporations. They can also create jobs for others by starting their own construction or consulting businesses as entrepreneurs.

Since its establishment in 2014, the Civil Engineering Department at PCCOER has made consistent and steady progress. The Department employs Outcome-Based Education (OBE), in which the entire programme and all instructional efforts are centred on the clearly defined outcomes that we expect students to demonstrate upon leaving the institution. In lieu of simply accumulating credits, we strive to deliver such content and implement such pedagogies and evaluations that our students achieve high order learning and mastery.

The department offers a 4-year, 8-semester full-time undergraduate programme in civil engineering. The department has a sufficient number of qualified, experienced, and devoted faculty members and support personnel. The department has spacious classrooms, a drawing room, a concept room, and a project room, as well as a research laboratory and nine experimentation laboratories with the most up-to-date equipment used in the field. Engineering Mechanics lab, Environmental Engineering lab, Fluid Mechanics Lab, Geotechnical lab, Geology lab, Testing of Materials lab, Surveying lab, Transportation Engineering lab, and Civil CAD lab are among the laboratories available.

The department equips students with a solid foundation of fundamental, scientific, and technical knowledge, a multidisciplinary approach, an; critical thinking skills to serve as the basis for lifelong learning in a career in civil engineering. This department prepares students to plan, analyse, design, develop, organise, and manage civil engineering projects. In addition, the department instills professionalism, ethics, the right attitude, effective communication skills, teamwork, and the ability to identify social needs and provide engineering solutions in its students.

Computer Engineering 
Computer Engineering skills continue to be in high demand across the globe from businesses in a variety of industries, and this field is undergoing explosive growth. This computer engineering degree is tailored to meet the requirements of these companies, allowing students to pursue rewarding careers. The curriculum designed by SPPU combines theoretical knowledge with hands-on experience to prepare students for the workforce. This programme is ideal for students who aspire to work in the IT industry and have the desire to become tool-savvy.

The Department of Computer Engineering at Pimpri Chinchwad College of Engineering and Research (PCCOER) was founded in 2015 with an initial intake of 60 students in the bachelor's degree programme and increased to 120 students in 2020. The Department utilises Outcome-Based Education (OBE), in which the entire programme and all instructional efforts are centred on the clearly defined outcomes that we expect students to demonstrate upon graduation. In lieu of simply accumulating credits, we strive to deliver such content and employ such pedagogies and assessment that our students achieve high order learning and mastery.

The department operates a four-year, eight-semester, full-time undergraduate programme in computer engineering. The department has a sufficient number of qualified, experienced, and devoted faculty members and support personnel. The department has large classrooms, a tutorial room, a department lobby (e-Shishyakulam), a project and research laboratory, and experimentation laboratories with the most up-to-date field-relevant equipment. Multimedia Lab, Web Development Lab, Programming Lab, DE & MP LAB, Computer Network Lab, Database Lab, and Computer Center are the laboratories available.

The department believes in student-centered, research-oriented course delivery and strives to produce engineering graduates who are culturally and socially aware, entrepreneurial, and possess leadership qualities. The faculty members' sincere efforts and sense of responsibility demonstrate their maturity to comprehend the problems of students and nurture them accordingly.

Mechanical Engineering 
Mechanical engineering is one of the most comprehensive engineering fields. Mechanical engineers design, create, construct, and evaluate. They are concerned with everything that moves, including components, machines, and the human body. Mechanical engineering combines creativity, knowledge, and analytical tools to accomplish the challenging task of materialising an idea. Mechanical engineers can seek employment in a variety of fields, such as manufacturing, aerospace, automotive, biomedical, chemical, computer, communications, nanotechnology, power-generation industries, engineering consultancies, energy utilities, and government agencies, among others.

A Mechanical Engineer may also pursue a career in the public sector via competitive examinations such as the UPSC, MPSC, and IES. If they perform exceptionally well on the GATE, they can find employment in a variety of Navratna and Maharatna enterprises. By pursuing ME/M.Tech/MS in India and abroad, they have excellent placement opportunities in national and multinational firms. They can also become job creators by becoming entrepreneurs and launching their own businesses.

Since its inception in 2014, the Mechanical Engineering Department at PCCOER has made consistent strides towards excellence. In accordance with the Outcome-Based Education (OBE) philosophy, the department prepares students for better placements, higher education, and entrepreneurship by emphasising the acquisition of knowledge, skills, hands-on training, and information and communication technology (ICT) techniques through a variety of teaching pedagogies. Audits of all of these initiatives are conducted on a regular basis, and their implementation is monitored to ensure that students are truly benefiting from the process.

The department administers a four-year, eight-semester full-time undergraduate programme in mechanical engineering. The department has a sufficient number of well-qualified, experienced, and committed faculty and support staff. The department has sixteen modern laboratories, spacious classrooms, a drawing hall, and a project and innovation centre. The department equips students with a solid foundation of fundamental, scientific, and technical knowledge, a multidisciplinary perspective, and critical thinking skills that serve as the basis for lifelong learning in Mechanical Engineering. The department encourages and assists students to participate in industry-sponsored projects and industrial training in order to familiarise them with industrial problems and their solutions and better prepare them for the workforce. Additionally, the department emphasizes instilling professionalism, ethics, and a genuine attitude in its students. It also places greater emphasis on enhancing students' communication skills, teamwork, and social awareness.

Information Technology

Administration & Governance 
Late Shri S.B. Patil established the Pimpri Chinchwad Education Trust (PCET) in the month of September, 1990. Its sole mission was to serve society, the industry, and all stakeholders by providing value-inculcating, high-quality schooling and professional training in the fields of engineering, management, and computer programming.

PCET has always been devoted to its mission of producing, disseminating, preserving, and applying knowledge, artistic, and academic values.

Nearly 7,200 students are being prepared for specialised courses such as Engineering, MBA, MCA, and PGDM on the campus in Akurdi, Pune, by professional and enthusiastic instructors. The campuses at Ravet educate approximately 11,700 students, including 1,200 would-be graduates at the College of Engineering, 800 students at the Junior College, and 2,500 students at the Public School.

Awards and Achievements

See also
 List of educational institutions in Pune

References 

Engineering colleges in Maharashtra
Colleges affiliated to Savitribai Phule Pune University
Universities and colleges in Pune
Education in Pimpri-Chinchwad
Educational institutions established in 2014
2014 establishments in Maharashtra